KMC Hospitals, also known as Kasturba Medical College Hospitals (Mangalore) are two hospitals situated in Mangalore. The hospitals are teaching hospitals of the Kasturba Medical College, Mangalore, a constituent unit of Manipal Academy of Higher Education. The hospital at Ambedkar circle is a part of the Manipal Hospitals.

Centers of Excellence
The hospital has various Centers of Excellence (CoE) such as
 Gastroenterology
 Cancer care
 Cardiology
 Nephrology
 Neurology
 Neurosurgery
 Obstetrics and Gynecology
 Spine care
 Joint replacement and Sports injury
 Urology

References

Hospitals in Mangalore
Year of establishment missing